Caroline Sophia Grundy Lunn ( – ) was a British novelist and hymnwriter.  

She married John Calbraith Lunn, an Irish-born Unitarian minister and amateur astronomer who was elected a fellow of the Royal Astronomical Society, in 1851.

In 1860, she published a collection of poems under the pseudonym Linus.  She went on to publish four novels in the 1870s and 1880s.  She contributed ten hymns to her husband's book Hymns for Religious Services (1880), including "Day and night the blessings fall".

Caroline Lunn died in 1893.

Bibliography 

 Poems.  1860.
 Only Eve.  3 vol.  London: Sampson Low, 1873.
 The Masters of Claythorpe.  3 vol.  London: Sampson Low, 1874.
 Clare Stellar: A Novel.  2 vol.  London: Remington, 1883.
 Shamrock and Rose: A Novel.  3 vol.  London: T. Fisher Unwin, 1888.

References 

 

Created via preloaddraft
1823 births
1893 deaths
British women writers
British hymnwriters
British women novelists
People from Leicestershire (before 1897)